Guy Landry Hazoumé (10 June 1940 – 22 August 2012) was a Beninese politician and poet. He was the foreign minister of Benin from 1987 to 1989. He was a graduate of the Institut d'Etudes Politiques was appointed director-general of political affairs in 1968. He also served as ambassador to the UN. He died on 22 August 2012.

Notes

References

1940 births
2012 deaths
Foreign ministers of Benin
20th-century Beninese politicians
20th-century Beninese writers